The 2019–20 LEB Oro season was the 24th season of the Spanish basketball second league. It started on 25 September 2019 with the first round of the regular season and was curtailed on 25 May 2020 due to the COVID-19 pandemic.

Teams

Promotion and relegation (pre-season)
A total of 18 teams contested the league, including 13 sides from the 2018–19 season, two relegated from the 2018–19 ACB and three promoted from the 2018–19 LEB Plata.

Teams relegated from Liga ACB
Delteco Gipuzkoa Basket
Leche Río Breogán

Teams promoted from LEB Plata
HLA Alicante
Afanion CB Almansa
Marín Ence PeixeGalego

Venues and locations

Personnel and sponsorship

Managerial changes

Season summary
On March 10, 2020, the Government of Spain decreed that all games would be played behind closed doors due to the COVID-19 pandemic. On March 12, 2020, the Spanish Basketball Federation postponed all the games of the next two weeks. On March 18, 2020, the Spanish Basketball Federation extended the postponement of the games until March 29 due to the state of alarm. On March 25, 2020, the Spanish Basketball Federation extended the postponement of the games until April 12 due to the extension of state of alarm. On April 15, 2020, the Spanish Basketball Federation started talks with the LEB Oro clubs to resolve the future of the league. On April 23, 2020, the Spanish Basketball Federation agreed with the LEB Oro clubs to revoke relegations to LEB Plata and advance in the formula to define the promotions to Liga ACB.

On May 8, 2020, the Spanish Basketball Federation finished prematurely the regular season due to force majeure with the following decisions:
Relegations to LEB Plata were revoked.
Promotions to Liga ACB remained.
Promotion playoffs would be played, as long as, on May 25, the Spanish Basketball Federation had the confirmation that it could be played before June 30, setting the health of the players as an absolute priority, and provided that it was certain that health authorities and clubs could comply with approved health protocols.
Promotion playoffs would be as follows:
The two top teams as of March 8 would play a game for decide the direct promotion. For this game, the game held in the regular season between the teams involved would be taken into consideration, and the winner of the basket average of both games would promote directly to Liga ACB.
Three matches would be played between the next six top teams as of March 8: 3rd vs. 8th, 4th vs. 7th, and 5th vs. 6th. The three winners, together with the losing team of the direct promotion game, would play a Final Four, whose winner would promote to Liga ACB.
If the sanitary conditions would make it impossible to play the promotion playoffs, the two top teams as of March 8 would promote to Liga ACB.

On May 25, 2020, the Spanish Basketball Federation cancelled the promotion playoffs and approved the promotions to Liga ACB of the two top teams.

Regular season

League table

Positions by round
The table lists the positions of teams after completion of each round. In order to preserve chronological evolvements, any postponed matches are not included in the round at which they were originally scheduled, but added to the full round they were played immediately afterwards.

Results

Copa Princesa de Asturias
The Copa Princesa de Asturias was played on 5 February 2020, by the two first qualified teams after the end of the first half of the season (round 17). The champion of the cup would play the playoffs against the ninth qualified if it would finished the league between the second and the fifth qualified.

Teams qualified

Game

Awards
All official awards of the 2019–20 LEB Oro season.

Copa Princesa de Asturias MVP

Source:

Player of the round

Regular season

Notes

References

External links
 Official website 

LEB
LEB Oro seasons
Second level Spanish basketball league seasons
2019–20 in European second tier basketball leagues
LEB Oro